Chenthilandavar Temple, Tiruchendur is an ancient Hindu temple dedicated to Murugan. It is second among six abodes of Murugan (Arupadaiveedugal) situated in Tamil Nadu, India. This temple is the fourth Hindu temple in Tamil Nadu to get ISO certification.  It is located in the eastern end of the town Tiruchendur in the district of Thoothukudi, Tamil Nadu, India. It is 40 km from Thoothukudi, 60 km south-east of Tirunelveli and 75 km north-east of Kanniyakumari. The temple complex is on the shores of Bay of Bengal. Temple is open from 5 AM to 9 PM

Arulmigu Subramaniya Swamy Temple, Tiruchendur is one of the six major abodes, or sacred temples, of the Kaumaram religion. Soorasamharam, a reenactment of the victory over Soorapadman, and Kanda Shasti, a devotional song in praise of Murugan are performed at the temple.

Vaippu Sthalam
It is one of the shrines of the Vaippu Sthalams sung by Tamil Saivite Nayanar Appar.

Architecture
The principal entrance faces south, and opens into the first of two prakarams, the first of which is lined with rows of Yalis. The inner sanctum of the temple is in a cave and the main deity, or moolavar, is Murugan as a saintly child, portrayed in a granite carving. Devotees undergo a ritual cleansing by bathing in water from the well after bathing in the ocean.

History

Dutch occupation of the Tiruchendur Temple

The Murugan temple at Tiruchendur was occupied by the Dutch East India company from 1646 to 1648, during the course of their war with the Portuguese. The local people tried to free their temple, with no success. The Dutch finally vacated the temple on orders from the Naik ruler. However, while leaving, they removed the sculpture depicting the 2 utsava murthis (this representation of the deities comes out only during Maasi and Aavani tirunal) which is made of an alloy named Shanmukhar, and took it with them. During their sea voyage, they encountered a strong storm and realised their mistake of stealing the murti. They dropped it in the middle of the sea and saw the storm stop immediately. Later, Senthil Aandavan appeared in a dream to Vadamaliyappa Pillai, an ardent devotee of Murugan, and revealed the place in the sea where the idol had been abandoned. Vadamlaiyappa Pillai in the Tiruchendur temple, went to the spot in a fishing boat and retrieved the murti in 1653. The story is shown in paintings inside the temple.

Administration
The temple is maintained and administered by the Hindu Religious and Charitable Endowments Department of the Government of Tamil Nadu.

References

External links

Official --- Website

Hindu temples in Thoothukudi district
Thoothukudi
Murugan temples in Tamil Nadu
Kaumaram